Malte Hellwig (born 23 October 1997) is a German field hockey player.

Career

Club level
In club competition, Hellwig plays for Uhlenhorst Mülheim in the German Bundesliga.

Junior national team
Malte Hellwig made his debut for the German U–21 team in 2016. His first appearance was during a test series against England in Bisham. 

In 2017, he won a bronze medal with the junior team at the EuroHockey Junior Championship in Valencia.

Die Honamas
Hellwig made his debut for Die Honamas in 2019, during season one of the FIH Pro League. Later that year he competed at the EuroHockey Championship in Antwerp.

References

External links
 
 

1997 births
Living people
German male field hockey players
Male field hockey forwards
Men's Feldhockey Bundesliga players
21st-century German people